Inga Juuso (5 October 1945 – 23 August 2014) was a Sami yoiker, singer and actress in the film The Kautokeino Rebellion. She was known from her own band performances, and recordings and collaborations with musicians like Steinar Raknes, Håkon Mjåset Johansen, and Jørn Øien.

Career
Juuso was the first Sami named "Traditional Folk Musician of the year" in Norway 2012, and had a long career performing with various musicians in Scandinavia. She also appeared in the film The Kautokeino Rebellion (2008) by Nils Gaup, and was recognized as a major carrier and promoter of the Sami cultural tradition.

In 2008, she released the album Patterns of the heart (DAT) by the Inga Juuso Group, followed by "Bálggis" ("Vuelie"), with the musical group Bárut.

Awards and honours
In 1998, she was awarded the Áillohaš Music Award for her significant contributions to Saami music. She was also awarded the title of Spellemannprisen in 2011.

Death
Juuso died on 23 August 2014, aged 68.

Discography
1991: "Ravddas Ravddi" (DAT), produced by Ande Somby.
1994: "Calbmeliiba" ("Frozen moments"/"Momentos inolvidables"; Iđut), with Johan Sara, Jai Shankar and flamenco musicians Rogelio de Badajoz Duran and Erik Steen
2008: "Vaimmo Ivnnit" ("Where the rivers meet"; DAT), with the duo Skáidi (including Steinar Raknes)
2008: "Patterns of the heart" (DAT), with the Inga Juuso Group, including Patrick Shaw Iversen, Kenneth Ekornes, Steinar Raknes, Peter Baden and Roger Ludvigsen
2011: "Bálggis" ("Vuelie"), with Barut (including Martin Smidt & Asbjørn Berson)

References

External links
 

 Transjoik Official Website
Vuelie Official Website

1945 births
2014 deaths
Musicians from Vefsn 
Norwegian Sámi musicians
Norwegian Sámi people
Áillohaš Music Award winners
Spellemannprisen winners
Place of death missing
Sámi actors